Stewart Finlay-McLennan (born 7 September 1957) is an Australian actor.

Finlay-McLennan was born and raised in Broken Hill. He earned a degree from Charles Sturt University in Bathurst, New South Wales, where he majored in Art and Drama.

Finlay-McLennan made his television debut in an episode of Jake and the Fatman in 1989. From 1994 to 1995, he played Dr. Neil MacNeill on the CBS television series, Christy. He appeared in National Treasure and the first season of Six Feet Under. He later appeared in The Last Sin Eater and  Prep School.

Finlay-McLennan appeared in a TV commercial for Outback Steakhouse in 2000 and Down an Alley Filled with Cats on Broadway.

Finlay-McLennan has retired from acting.

Filmography

References

External links

1957 births
Australian male film actors
Australian male stage actors
Australian male television actors
Living people